"I'll Be Around" is the second single released from Rappin' 4-Tay's second album, Don't Fight the Feelin'. The song both sampled the music and retained the original chorus of The Spinners' song of the same name, though Rappin' 4-Tay replaced the song's original lyrics with his own. The Spinners were credited as featured artists and songwriters Thom Bell and Phil Hurtt were both given writing credits.

The song became 4-Tay's second consecutive Top 40 single, peaking at #39 on the Billboard Hot 100 and #5 on the Hot Rap Singles, becoming his biggest hit on that chart. It also made #30 on the UK Singles Chart. The single became The Spinners' last Top 40 hit in both the US and UK, some 34 years after their first, 1961's "That's What Girls Are Made For".

Charts

Weekly charts

Year-end charts

References

1994 songs
1995 singles
Rappin' 4-Tay songs
Chrysalis Records singles
Songs written by Thom Bell